"Murder on My Mind" (censored as "Mischief on My Mind") is the third single by American rapper YNW Melly from his debut mixtape I Am You. The song was originally uploaded onto SoundCloud on March 4, 2017, and later released as a single by 300 Entertainment on June 1, 2018. "Murder on My Mind" is considered YNW Melly's breakout hit, and garnered even further attention after the rapper turned himself in for double murder charges on February 13, 2019.

Background
YNW Melly thought up the chorus of "Murder on My Mind" when he was first incarcerated at the age of 16. The song is not written as a confession of his alleged double murder, as the song was released in March 2017, while the alleged murders occurred in October 2018.

A music video for "Murder on My Mind", directed by Gabriel Hart, was released on August 3, 2018.

Commercial performance
After news broke of YNW Melly's murder charges on February 13, 2019, "Murder on My Mind" garnered major public interest. Days later, the song reached number one on the US Apple Music chart. On national charts, it peaked inside the top 20 in the US, the UK and New Zealand, as well as reaching the top 10 in both Canada and Belgium.

Charts

Weekly charts

Year-end charts

Certifications

References

2017 songs
YNW Melly songs
2018 singles